Ronielle Faria Gomes (born 6 November 1977 in Lavras) was a Brazilian football player.

Football career
Ronielle was played for Araxá in Minas Gerais before moved to Club 12 de Octubre in summer 2003.

Ronielle played for NK Posušje and NK Zagreb in 2004/05 season. He was signed by NK Široki Brijeg in summer 2005. Before going to Bosnia and Herzegovina again, he also trialed at FC Midtjylland.

References

External links
 Roni at playmakerstats.com (English version of ogol.com.br)
 Brazilian FA Database 
 Profile at Araxá official website 

1977 births
Living people
Brazilian footballers
Association football midfielders
NK Zagreb players
NK Široki Brijeg players
Expatriate footballers in Croatia
Brazilian expatriate sportspeople in Croatia
Expatriate footballers in Bosnia and Herzegovina
Brazilian expatriate sportspeople in Bosnia and Herzegovina
People from Lavras
HŠK Posušje players
Clube Atlético Tricordiano players
Araxá Esporte Clube players
Esporte Clube XV de Novembro (Piracicaba) players
Morrinhos Futebol Clube players
Nacional Futebol Clube players
América Futebol Clube (MG) players
Associação Atlética Caldense players
União São João Esporte Clube players
12 de Octubre Football Club players
Sportspeople from Minas Gerais